Chupke Se Bhar Ajaye is a 2014 Pakistani drama television series produced by Ahsan Khan and Meraj Uddin, directed by Owais Khan and written by Mansoor Saeed, based on the novel of the same name by Salma Kanwal. Also starring Khan in the lead role along with Sajal Aly and Rahma Ali, the series originally aired on A-Plus Entertainment from October 17, 2014 to February 27, 2015.

Plot 
Saira is dreamy and poor and full of life girl who aspires to be rich and wealthy. On the other hand, Saira's friend Shafaq has complexes as she compares herself with Saira and considers herself of ordinary shape and face. The story revolves around their interconnected fate that how both overcome their complexes after facing a huge.

Cast 

 Ahsan Khan as Saqib
 Sajal Aly as Saira
 Rahma Ali as Shafaq
 Shaheen Khan as Saleha
 Laila Zuberi as Ammara
 Javed Sheikh as Faiq
 Ismat Zaidi as Shafaq's mother
 Mona Shah as Afifa
 Anita Camphor as Gul Bibi
 Saleem Meiraj as Waseem
 Yasir Mazhar as Farooq

References

External links 

Pakistani drama television series
2014 Pakistani television series debuts
2015 Pakistani television series endings